The 2014 Furman Paladins team represented Furman University as a member of the Southern Conference (SoCon) during the 2014 NCAA Division I FCS football season. Led by fourth-year head coach Bruce Fowler, the Paladins compiled an overall record of 3–9 with a mark of 2–5 in conference play, placing sixth in the SoCon. The team played home games at Paladin Stadium in Greenville, South Carolina.

Schedule

Ranking movements

References

Furman
Furman Paladins football seasons
Furman Paladins football